Gijet is a town in southern Tigray, Ethiopia. Gijet is the largest settlement in the Saharti Samre district. During the Imperial era, Gijet was the center of the Saharti woreda. Since 2020, it is again the centre of the new Saharti woreda.

References 

Populated places in the Tigray Region